The Royal Rumble is a professional wrestling pay-per-view (PPV) and livestreaming event, produced annually since 1988 by WWE, the world's largest professional wrestling promotion. It is named after the Royal Rumble match, a modified battle royal in which the participants enter at timed intervals instead of all beginning in the ring at the same time. The event is held in late January. After the initial 1988 event was broadcast as a television special on the USA Network, the Royal Rumble has been shown on PPV since the 1989 event. It also became available to livestream on the WWE Network in 2015 and on Peacock in 2022. It is one of WWE's five biggest events of the year, along with WrestleMania, SummerSlam, Survivor Series, and Money in the Bank, referred to as the "Big Five".

The Royal Rumble match is generally contested as the main event match of the annual event. There are some exceptions, such as the 1988, 1996, 1997, 1998, 2006, 2013, and 2023 events. In 1988, the main event was a tag team match, while for all the others, it was a men's world championship match. While originally only for men, a women's version of the Royal Rumble match was held as the main event at the 2018 event, which was also the first event to have two Rumble matches on one card. It subsequently became standard to have both a men's and women's Royal Rumble match at the annual event.

History

Event 
The Royal Rumble match was created by wrestler and WWE Hall of Famer Pat Patterson and the event was established by the World Wrestling Federation (WWF, now WWE). After the match was first tested at a house show in October 1987, the first Royal Rumble event took place on January 24, 1988, and was broadcast live as a television special on the USA Network. The following year, the event started to be broadcast on pay-per-view (PPV), and thus became one of the "Big Four" annual PPVs, along with WrestleMania, Survivor Series, and SummerSlam, the promotion's four biggest shows of the year. From 1993 to 2002, it was considered one of the "Big Five", including King of the Ring, but that PPV event was discontinued after 2002. In August 2021, Money in the Bank became recognized as one of the "Big Five".

In May 2002, the WWF was renamed to World Wrestling Entertainment (WWE) following a lawsuit with the World Wildlife Fund over the "WWF" initialism. In April 2011, the promotion ceased using its full name with the "WWE" abbreviation becoming an orphaned initialism. Also in March 2002, the promotion introduced the brand extension, in which the roster was divided between the Raw and SmackDown brands where wrestlers were exclusively assigned to perform on their respective weekly television shows—ECW became a third brand in 2006. The first brand extension was dissolved in August 2011, but it was reintroduced in July 2016 (other brands, including NXT, NXT UK, and 205 Live, would also be active during this second brand split). The Royal Rumble, along with the other original "Big Four" events, were the only PPVs to never be held exclusively for one brand during either brand split periods. The 2008 Royal Rumble was the first WWE pay-per-view to be available in high-definition. In 2015, the Royal Rumble began to air on WWE's online streaming service, the WWE Network, which launched in February 2014, and in 2022, the event became available on Peacock as the American version of the WWE Network merged under Peacock in March 2021.

As a result of the COVID-19 pandemic that began affecting the industry in March 2020, WWE had to hold its events behind closed doors. The 2021 event was in turn held in WWE's bio-secure bubble called the WWE ThunderDome, which at the time was hosted at Tropicana Field in St. Petersburg, Florida. WWE resumed live touring in July 2021 and the 2022 event was held at The Dome at America's Center in St. Louis, Missouri.

Due to the Rumble matches taking up a large amount of time (most Rumble matches last roughly one hour), the Rumble event tends to have a smaller card than most other pay-per-view events, which routinely have six to eight matches per card though with the Royal Rumble expanding to a five-hour show as well as a two-hour kickoff pre-show starting in 2018, the card then mainly featured anywhere from nine to twelve matches with two or three of those matches taking place on the kickoff show. In 2022, however, WWE phased out the pre-shows with the Rumble returning to around six matches on the card and a runtime of around three to four hours. The men's Royal Rumble match is usually located at the top of the card, though there have been exceptions, such as the 1988, 1996, 1997, 1998, 2006, 2013, 2018, and 2023 events. In these cases, 1988's main event was a tag team match, while the others were men's world championship matches, except in 2018. The 2018 Royal Rumble was the first to include a women's Royal Rumble match, which was the main event for that year. It was subsequently the first in which two Rumble matches were contested on one card and it is now standard for the event to include both a men's and women's Rumble match.

Match 

The Royal Rumble match is based on the classic battle royal, in which a number of wrestlers (traditionally 30) aim at eliminating their competitors by tossing them over the top rope, with both feet touching the floor. The difference between a Royal Rumble and a standard battle royal is that in a standard battle royal, all participants start the match in the ring at the same time, where in a Royal Rumble match, two participants start and then the rest enter at timed intervals. The winner of the match is the last wrestler remaining after all others have been eliminated. Since the 1993 event, the prize for winning is a world championship match at WrestleMania, with the exception of the 2016 event, where the prize of the match was the championship itself as reigning champion Roman Reigns defended the title in the match. According to Hornswoggle, who worked for WWE from 2006 until 2016 and participated in two Rumbles, participants may learn their eliminations by knowing the two wrestlers who are eliminated before them and which wrestlers are entering the Royal Rumble before and after their elimination.

Events and winners

Video box set 
In March 2007, WWE released a complete DVD box set titled Royal Rumble: The Complete Anthology, which showcases every Royal Rumble event in its entirety, up to the 2007 Royal Rumble.

References 
 General
 
 
 
 
 
 
 

 Specific

Further reading

External links 

 
 WWE.com: Royal Rumble match description
 WWE.com: Royal Rumble Facts & Figures
 Royal Rumble History at About.com
 WWE Royal Rumble

 
Recurring events established in 1988